An election will be held on November 5, 2024, to elect all 50 members to North Carolina's Senate. The election will coincide with the elections for other offices, including the U.S. President, U.S. House of Representatives, and state house.

References

North Carolina senate
senate
2024